Bayencourt is a commune in the Somme department in Hauts-de-France in northern France.

Geography
A very small village, situated on the junction of the D23 and D129 roads, about halfway between Arras and Amiens.

Population

See also
Communes of the Somme department

References

Communes of Somme (department)